Dagmar Droysen-Reber (born 25 August 1928) is a German musicologist and museum director.

Life 
Droysen-Reber was born in Barmen. After studying musicology, experimental physics and Romance studies and obtaining her doctorate as Dr. phil., she initially worked as a piano teacher and held various honorary positions in international musicological associations.

In the State Institute for Music Research she was initially head of the acoustics department until 1984. In 1989 she was appointed director of the Berlin Musical Instrument Museum and was provisional director from 1989 to 1992 and until 31 August 1994 as the predecessor of Thomas Ertelt director of the State Institute for Music Research.

Her successor at the museum is Conny Restle.

Awards 
 1986: Verdienstkreuz am Bande der Bundesrepublik Deutschland

Publications 
 Jahrbuch des Staatlichen Instituts für Musikforschung, 1968 1968 ff., 
 Staatliches Institut für Musikforschung Preußischer Kulturbesitz (ed.): Wege zur Musik. Herausgegeben anläßlich der Eröffnung des neuen Hauses. Redaction: Dagmar Droysen-Reber. SIMPK, Berlin 1984, 
 Berliner Musikinstrumenten-Museum. Bestandskatalog, Berlin o. J. (together with Conny Restle)
 Harfen des Berliner Musikinstrumentenmusems, Bestandskatalog in cooperation with Beat Wolf, Wolfgang Mertin, Rainer M. Thurau. Ed.: Staatliches Institut für Musikforschung Preußischer Kulturbesitz, Berlin 1999

References

External links 
 Dagmar Drysen: Mit Wäschekörben in den Osten on the site of the Stiftung Preußischer Kulturbesitz.
 

Musicologists from Berlin
Women musicologists
Directors of museums in Germany
Recipients of the Cross of the Order of Merit of the Federal Republic of Germany
1928 births
Living people
Writers from Wuppertal